In number theory, Bonse's inequality, named after H. Bonse, relates the size of a primorial to the smallest prime that does not appear in its prime factorization. It states that if p1, ..., pn, pn+1 are the smallest n + 1 prime numbers and n ≥ 4, then

 
(the middle product is short-hand for the primorial  of pn)

Mathematician Denis Hanson showed an upper bound where .

See also 
 Primorial prime

Notes

References 

Theorems about prime numbers
Inequalities